Village Law may refer to:

 Indonesian Village Law
 Village Law (Turkey)
 A chapter of the Consolidated Laws of New York

See also 
 Local ordinance